George Wright (born 22 December 1969) is a South African-born Scottish television presenter, football agent and former professional player who played most of his career as a defender or midfielder for Heart of Midlothian.

Playing career
Wright started his youth football at Hutchison Vale Boys Club in Edinburgh. He was signed by Premier Division club Hearts in August 1987 and made his first start in the 1989–90 season. Wright scored three goals in total for the Jambos, including the opening goal in a 3–1 victory over Celtic in 1991–92 season in front over 22,000 fans at Tynecastle. He was also part of the Hearts side that won the 1991 Tennnents Sixes. Never a first team regular at Hearts, Wright left Tynecastle in 1995 but failed to hold down a first team place at Falkirk, Livingston or Cowdenbeath and retired from football in 1998 at the age of 28.

Post football
After his playing career Wright worked in TV, presenting a football show on the local Edinburgh L!VE TV and on Jo Guest In Jamaica on Men & Motors. As of 2010, Wright worked as a football agent.

References

External links

1969 births
Living people
Soccer players from Johannesburg
Association football defenders
Association football midfielders
Scottish footballers
Heart of Midlothian F.C. players
Falkirk F.C. players
Livingston F.C. players
Cowdenbeath F.C. players
Scottish Football League players
Dunbar United F.C. players
Lothian Thistle Hutchison Vale F.C. players